Doris Abele was an Antarctic marine biologist based at the Alfred Wegener Institute (AWI) in Germany. She led the research group working on stress physiology and aging in marine invertebrates and also the Ecology Polar regions And Coasts in the changing Earth System (PACES) programme.

Early life and education
Abele received her Diploma in Biology from Düsseldorf University in 1984, followed by a PhD in marine biology and biochemistry in 1988. She worked as a postdoctoral researcher at the University of Bremen in 1989 where she specialised in oxygen radical research.

Career and impact
Abele's research interests lay in physiological ageing in ectotherms, the evolution of genes and genomes, the impact of climatic changes on Antarctic coastal benthos, and HIF-1 homologs in marine organisms. In addition to her scientific papers, she has also published university course material as well as books.

From 2007-2009 she coordinated the IPY_ClicOPEN project of Climate Change Effects on Coastal Ecosystems at the Antarctic Peninsula.  From 2011-13 she coordinated the IMCOAST project Impact of climate change on Antarctic Coastal Ecosystems. From 2013-2016 she served as the role of coordinator as part of the Network for Staff Exchange and Training at IMCONet on the Interdisciplinary Modelling of climate change in Coastal Western Antarctica.

Abele has led 9 expeditions to the Carlini station, King George Island, Antarctica (to work in the Dallmann Laboratory). She leads the international ESF (European Social Fund) Programme, IMCOAST (Impact of Climate Change on Antarctic Coastal Systems: 2010-2016). While in the employ of AWI Abele has collaborated extensively with the British Antarctic Survey. She is the coordinator for MCONet - Interdisciplinary Modelling of Climate Change in Coastal Western Antarctica – Network for Staff Exchange and Training. In addition to her research, she also lectures at the University of Bremen.

Selected works

Awards and honors
Abele received the Biomaris (Biomaris Research Prize for Promoting Marine Sciences in the Federal State of Bremen) Award of the state of Bremen in 2013.

References

External links
 

German women scientists
Year of birth missing (living people)
Living people
German marine biologists
Heinrich Heine University Düsseldorf alumni
German Antarctic scientists
Women earth scientists
Women Antarctic scientists